Arhines is a genus of beetles belonging to the family Curculionidae.

Species:

Arhines callizonatus 
Arhines hirtus 
Arhines languidus 
Arhines posthumus 
Arhines tutus

References

Curculionidae
Curculionidae genera